Muskegon County is a county in the U.S. state of Michigan. As of 2020, the population was 175,824. The county seat is Muskegon.

Muskegon County comprises the Muskegon, MI Metropolitan Statistical Area, which is part of the larger Grand Rapids-Kentwood-Muskegon, MI Combined Statistical Area.

History
Around 1812, Jean Baptiste Recollect and Pierre Constant set up trading posts in the area. By the Treaty of Washington (1836), Native Americans ceded parts of Michigan, including future Muskegon County, to the United States. This opened up the area to greater settlement by European Americans, who developed farms.

Prior to 1859, the majority of Muskegon County was part of Ottawa County (the Southern three quarters). Grand Haven served as the County Seat of this combined County, and still serves as the Ottawa County seat today.

Muskegon County was organized in 1859. Its name is from the Muskegon River, which runs through it and empties into Muskegon Lake and subsequently flows into Lake Michigan. The word "Muskegon" comes from the Ojibwa/Chippewa word mashkig, meaning "marsh" or "swamp".  See List of Michigan county name etymologies.

Geography

Michigan's second longest river, Muskegon River, flows through the county with its north and south branches emptying into Muskegon Lake. Muskegon Lake then empties into Lake Michigan via the Muskegon Channel. Muskegon Lake is Michigan's only deep water port on Lake Michigan. In the north the White River flows through the county into White Lake and then on to Lake Michigan. In the south, Black Creek flows into Mona Lake which also flow into Lake Michigan. These three lakes allow boat navigation to and from Lake Michigan, making it one of the states most boat accessible counties, with Muskegon Lake allowing access for additional large commercial vessels.

Bodies of water
 Muskegon Lake
 Muskegon River
 Mona Lake
 White Lake
 White River
 Little Black Lake
 Little Blue Lake
 Wolf Lake
 Fox Lake
 Big Blue Lake
 Bear Lake
 Duck Lake
 Twin Lake

National protected area
 Manistee National Forest (part)

Major highways

 (Muskegon)
 (Whitehall-Montague)

Adjacent counties
By land
 Oceana County, Michigan - north
 Newaygo County, Michigan - northeast
 Kent County, Michigan - east
 Ottawa County, Michigan - east
 Ottawa County, Michigan - south
By water
 Milwaukee County, Wisconsin - southwest
 Ozaukee County, Wisconsin - west

Demographics

As of the 2010 United States Census, there were 172,188 people living in the county. 77.4% were non-Hispanic White, 14.6% Black or African American, 0.6% Asian, 0.9% Native American, and 2.5% of two or more races. 4.8% were Hispanic or Latino (of any race).

As of the census of 2000, there were 170,200 people, 63,330 households, and 44,267 families living in the county. There were 68,556 housing units at an average density of 135 per square mile (52/km2). The racial makeup of the county was 81.25% White, 14.20% Black or African American, 0.82% Native American, 0.42% Asian, 0.01% Pacific Islander, 1.28% from other races, and 2.01% from two or more races. 3.53% of the population were Hispanic or Latino of any race. 17.2% were of German, 9.8% Dutch, 7.3% American, 7.2% English, 6.8% Irish and 5.5% Polish ancestry, 95.9% spoke English and 2.6% Spanish as their first language.

There were 63,330 households, of which 34.60% had children under the age of 18 living with them, 51.60% were married couples living together, 13.90% had a female householder with no husband present, and 30.10% were non-families. 25.20% of all households were made up of individuals, and 10.40% had someone living alone who was 65 years of age or older. The average household size was 2.59 and the average family size was 3.10.

In the county, the population was spread out, with 27.50% under the age of 18, 8.70% from 18 to 24, 29.00% from 25 to 44, 21.90% from 45 to 64, and 12.90% who were 65 years of age or older. The median age was 36 years. For every 100 females, there were 98.30 males. For every 100 females age 18 and over, there were 95.40 males.

The county's median household income was $38,008, and the median family income was $45,710. Males had a median income of $35,952 versus $25,430 for females. The per capita income for the county was $17,967. About 8.80% of families and 11.40% of the population were below the poverty line, including 16.00% of those under age 18 and 8.20% of those age 65 or over.

Government
Prior to 1932, Muskegon County was a Republican Party stronghold in presidential elections, aside from 1912 where the split Republican vote primarily backed former president & third-party candidate Theodore Roosevelt. The county became a Republican-leaning swing county from 1932 to 1988, backing the national winner from 1920 to 1996 except for 1960 & 1976, & those two years along with 2004 are the only years from 1920 on where it failed to back the winner of the national popular vote. Starting with the 1992 election, the county has consistently backed Democratic Party presidential candidates. In recent years, Muskegon County has become increasingly competitive, with Donald Trump very narrowly losing the county in both 2016 and  2020.

County government
The county government operates the jail, maintains rural roads, operates the
major local courts, keeps files of deeds and mortgages, maintains vital records, administers
public health regulations, and participates with the state in the provision of welfare and
other social services. The county board of commissioners controls the
budget but has only limited authority to make laws or ordinances. In Michigan, most local
government functions — police and fire, building and zoning, tax assessment, street
maintenance, etc. — are the responsibility of individual cities and townships.

Elected officials
 Prosecuting Attorney: D.J. Hilson 
 Sheriff: Michael J. Poulin 
 County Clerk: Nancy A. Waters 
 County Treasurer: Tony Moulatsiotis 
 Register of Deeds: Mark F. Fairchild 
 Drain Commissioner: Brenda M Moore 
 County Surveyor: Stephen Vallier

(information as of May 2017)

State representation
The Michigan Department of Corrections operates the Muskegon Correctional Facility in southeastern Muskegon. The prison first opened in 1974.

Education
Public School Districts in Muskegon County:
Fruitport Community Schools
Holton Public Schools
Mona Shores Public Schools
Montague Area Public Schools
Muskegon Public Schools
Muskegon Heights Public Schools
North Muskegon Public Schools
Orchard View Schools
Oakridge Public Schools
Ravenna Public Schools
Reeths-Puffer School District
White Lake Area Community Ed.
Whitehall District Schools

Private School Districts in Muskegon County:
Broadway Baptist School
Fruitport Calvary Christian
Muskegon Catholic Central
West Michigan Christian

Colleges and Universities:
Baker College
Muskegon Community College
Ross Medical Education Center - Muskegon

Historical markers
There are twenty-three recognized historical markers in the county:  They are:
 Bluffton Actors' Colony / Buster Keaton
 Central United Methodist Church [Muskegon]
 Evergreen Cemetery
 Fruitland District No.6 School
 Hackley House
 Hackley Public Library
 Hackley-Holt House
 Hume House
 Jean Baptiste Recollect Trading Post
 Lakeside
 Lebanon Lutheran Church
 Lumbering on White Lake / Staples & Covell Mill
 Marsh Field
 Mouth Cemetery
 Muskegon Business College
 Muskegon Log Booming Company
 Muskegon Woman's Club
 Old Indian Cemetery
 Pinchtown
 Ruth Thompson
 Torrent House
 Union Depot (Muskegon)
 White Lake Yacht Club

Communities

Cities
Montague
Muskegon Heights
Muskegon (county seat)
North Muskegon
Norton Shores
Roosevelt Park
Whitehall

Villages
Casnovia
Fruitport
Lakewood Club
Ravenna

Census-designated places
Twin Lake
Wolf Lake

Unincorporated communities
Wabaningo
Brunswick (partially)

Townships

Blue Lake Township
Casnovia Township
Cedar Creek Township
Dalton Township
Egelston Township
Fruitland Township
Fruitport Charter Township
Holton Township
Laketon Township
Montague Township
Moorland Township
Muskegon Charter Township
Ravenna Township
Sullivan Township
White River Township
Whitehall Township

See also

 List of Michigan State Historic Sites in Muskegon County, Michigan
Muskegon Area Transit System
National Register of Historic Places listings in Muskegon County, Michigan

References

Further reading

External links
Michigan Historical Markers.
Muskegon County web site
Muskegon Area First - County-wide Economic Development agency
Bluffton Church - Muskegon Independent Church

 
Michigan counties
Grand Rapids metropolitan area
1859 establishments in Michigan
Populated places established in 1859